The Ottoman journal Anadolu Mecmuası (Ottoman-Turkish:انادولو مجموعه سى; DMG: Anadolu Mecmuası; English: "Anatolia") was published in Istanbul in 11 issues between 1924 and 1925. It was edited by Hilmi Ziya Ülken (1901-1974), a philosopher and professor for sociology at the University of Istanbul and by the historian Mükrimin Halil Yinanç (1898-1961). The idea of the journal was born by an intellectual movement of professors and students of different disciplines (“Anadoluculuk“), with Yinanç as their main representative. The journal served the spreading of their ideas and as literary platform for Anatolian topics such as folklore, history, philosophy and geography. The term “anatolian homeland“ should demonstrate that it defines the nation and the history of the Turkish Republic should be considered as the history of Anatolia.

References

Further reading
 Ran Boytner, Lynn Swartz Dodd, Bradley J. Parker: Controlling the Past, owning the Future: The Political Uses of Archaeology in the Middle East, Tucson 2010.
 Dirican, Rabia: Anadolu Mecmuasi’nin Türk Düşünce Hayati Açisindan Değerlendirilmesi, in: International Journal of Social Science, No. 25-I, 2014, p. 387-398.
 Dressler, Markus: Writing Religion: The Making of Turkish Alevi Islam, Oxford 2013.
 Gürpınar, Doğan: Ottoman/Turkish Visions of the Nation, 1860–1950, New York 2013.
 Abdullah Uçman, "Anadolu Mecmuası", Turkey Diyanet Foundation Encyclopedia of Islam.

External links

 Online-Version: Anadolu
 Further information: www.translatio.uni-bonn.de
 Digital editions: Arabische, persische und osmanisch-türkische Periodika

1924 establishments in Turkey
1925 disestablishments in Turkey
Cultural magazines published in Turkey
Defunct magazines published in Turkey
Magazines established in 1924
Magazines disestablished in 1925
Magazines published in Istanbul
Turkish-language magazines